Chuck Blasdel (born 1971) is a former Speaker Pro-Tempore in the Ohio House of Representatives., and was the Representative of Ohio's 1st district from 2001 through 2006. He was the Republican nominee for U.S. Congress in Ohio's 6th congressional district.

Early life, education, and family 
Blasdel was born in Akron, Ohio.  He received an AA degree in accounting from Ohio Valley Business College, (now Ohio Valley College of Technology).  He is married to Monica (née Robb) Blasdel and has four children.

Business career 
Blasdel runs his own investment adviser firm, Blasdel Financial Group, and has property holdings in eastern Ohio.

Ohio state legislature 
In 2000, Blasdel defeated Democrat John Wargo for the open House seat in Columbiana County in eastern Ohio (then called the 3rd district before the 2001 redistricting) that had been served for more than a decade by a Democrat.

In 2002, Blasdel won over Wellsville dentist Dr. Frank Rivelle.  In 2004, Blasdel had a tougher race, beating Frank Rayl Jr. by just 1 percentage point.  Blasdel ran for Congress in 2006, and was succeeded by Democrat Linda Bolon in the 1st district.

During his time in the House of Representatives, Blasdel was the second-ranking Republican in the Ohio House, and one of its leading conservatives.  Blasdel rose to his position in just his third two-year term.  According to the Associated Press, he did it by raising more money than anyone except Republican Jon Husted, the House speaker.

Political positions 

In an interview in August 2006, Blasel said "I very consistently support pro-life positions. ...I supported the Constitutional Amendment to outlaw gay marriage in Ohio. ...I think tax issues are important, but I think one of the biggest challenges we face in Ohio is that our regulatory agencies are completely out of control. I have a very strong track record of standing up against the EPA, some of the bureaucrats in Columbus... some of our regulatory agencies. I even put in writing to the Governor of Ohio that I thought the EPA in Ohio was engaged in...legalized extortion against the business community."

2006 campaign for the U.S. House of Representatives 
Blasdel got 49 percent of the vote in a four-way GOP primary to become the Republican nominee for the House seat being vacated by Democratic Congressman Ted Strickland.  Strickland did not run for reelection as he successfully ran for Governor of Ohio.

Blasdel was defeated by Democrat Charlie Wilson in the November 2006 general election.

References

External links 
Chuck Blasdel's official campaign site archived from the original by archive.org 2006-12-06
Open Secrets - Chuck Blasdel
2006 federal campaign contributions
Follow the money - Chuck Blasdel
2004 2002 2000 state campaign contributions
 Associated Press profile, accessed October 31, 2006

1971 births
Living people
Republican Party members of the Ohio House of Representatives
Politicians from Akron, Ohio
21st-century American politicians